The Moment of Truth World Tour was the second worldwide tour by American recording artist Whitney Houston and supported her multi-platinum hit album Whitney. The trek started on July 4, 1987 in North America and continued overseas during 1988 in Europe, Asia and Australia.

As reported by Pollstar Magazine's top-grossing tours in 1987, Houston had the seventh highest-earning and the highest-grossing tour by a female artist that year. The North American leg tour alone grossed over $20.1 million.

The name of the tour, Moment of Truth, was a track that was to be on the Whitney album and subsequently left off and was replaced with "You're Still My Man". The song "Moment of Truth" was featured on the B-side to the US 7" single for "I Wanna Dance With Somebody (Who Loves Me)". It was also released on the CD single for "Exhale (Shoop Shoop)".

Background
Following the release of Whitney, Houston began promoting the album with a world tour. She began on July 4 in Tampa, Florida, where she played to over 70,000 people. She returned to the Sunshine State where she ended her North American leg at the Orange County Convention Center on December 8, 1987.

In Europe, Houston visited 12 countries, playing to over half a million fans. Houston played nine consecutive nights at Wembley Arena in London. At the same time, the singer had just broken The Beatles' record of seven consecutive #1 singles in the US. A party was thrown with guests such as Elton John, Fleetwood Mac, and Clive Davis. Houston cancelled an Italian concert date after agreeing to fly back to London to pay tribute to a then-imprisoned Nelson Mandela who was celebrating his birthday. Houston performed a set at Wembley Stadium, playing to over 72,000 fans during the historic event. Following this, Houston resumed her tour in Italy. In 1988, Houston returned from the European leg to perform a benefit concert for the United Negro College Fund on August 28 at Madison Square Garden in New York. It was Houston's only North American date during 1988 after playing 89 dates the previous year. The concert raised over $300,000 for the UNCF.

The tour was one of the top ten highest-grossing tours of the year. The North American leg of the tour alone grossed over $24 million, enough to make her the second highest-earning female entertainer of the year according to Forbes. In addition, the European leg was sold out.

The show
Like her previous tour, Houston again performed on a round stage in the center of the arena or auditorium so that everyone could see her. The seven-piece band was situated below her.  There were two outfit changes; no stage props. However, unlike her previous tour, Houston called upon three backup dancers during the uptempo songs. The dance routines were choreographed by Damita Jo Freeman and Khandi Alexander. Jonathan Butler opened for select dates, and Kenny G was featured as the main opening act the North American leg.

With two albums under her belt, the singer had more material to choose from. She included most of the songs from Whitney, the biggest hits from her debut, as well as the gospel song "He/I Believe". Houston also performed songs from her peers during various concerts, interpreting Aretha Franklin, Chaka Khan, Luther Vandross, Anita Baker, and Janet Jackson. Like her debut tour, Houston proved herself to be a creative musician. She rearranged most of the songs into soulful jazzy numbers and did a lot of improvisation. The Montreal Gazette said, "Whatever faults the 24-year-old singer has, she is first and foremost a creative musician." The pop hit "How Will I Know" was given a jazzy beginning and gospel-like ending. "You Give Good Love" was slowed down into a steamy and sensual slow jam. Houston often scatted with sax player Jay Davidson on "Just the Lonely Talking Again". Most critics noted "He/I Believe" and "Greatest Love of All" as being the show's highlights.

Despite the praise for her voice and arrangements, many critics noted her lack of dancing and movements. The Richmond Times said "she is about as stiff as a cardboard box." Some noted that she lacked a true personality. Others complained that despite the name of the tour, she followed the same formula as her previous tour. Jon Pareles of the New York Times reviewed her Madison Square Garden concert and said, "Ms. Houston may be a new kind of pop singer for the video era: an encyclopedic, restless virtuoso. She has absorbed the soul and pop styles of everyone from Aretha Franklin to Barbra Streisand to Diana Ross to Al Green; she can deliver a gospel rasp, a velvety coo, a floating soprano and a cheerleader's whoop."

Opening acts 
 Kenny G (USA—Leg)
 Jonathan Butler (USA-Leg—select dates)
Giorge Pettus (Europe-Leg—select dates)

Setlist

Shows

Personnel
Band
Musical Director / Piano – John Simmons
Bass guitar / Bass synthesizer – Rickey Minor 
Keyboards – Willard Meeks
Saxophone – Jay Davidson
Guitar – Steve Kelly 
Drums – Gregory Grainger
Percussion – Kevin Jones 
Background vocalists – Gary Houston, Felicia Moss, Voneva Simms, Billy Baker

Choreography
Choreographer – Damita Jo Freeman
Assistant choreographer – Khandi Alexander
Dancers
Frantz Hall, Leesa Humphrey, Raymond Delbarrio
Tour Management
Manager – Tony Bulluck

Broadcast and recordings
 One of the Wembley Arena shows in London was recorded for a Whitney Houston 1988 Europe tour special and broadcast on Rai Uno TV in Italy. Performances from this show—"Love Will Save the Day", "Greatest Love of All", "He, I Believe" and "I Wanna Dance with Somebody" were featured in the tour special. There were no official recordings released to the public.

References

External links
 moment of truth tour - whitneyhouston

1987 concert tours
1988 concert tours
Whitney Houston concert tours